Martin Jůza is a Czech Magic: The Gathering player. Over the course of his career, Jůza has won the Czech national championship, made the top eight of a Pro Tour three times, and won four Grand Prix tournaments.

Career 
Jůza's Pro Tour career began in 2003 when he made his debut with a 194th-place finish at Pro Tour New Orleans. He would go on to make one more Pro Tour appearance that season, a 163rd-place finish at the World Championship. The following season, he had two Pro Tour appearances again. He also had his first high level finish that season when he won the Czech National Championship. Jůza put up similar results in 2006 and 2007, playing two Pro Tours both years, making his country's national team in 2006, and qualifying for Worlds as the alternate in 2007.

The 2008 season was Jůza's breakout year. It was the first time he played every Pro Tour, and he only finished outside the top twenty once. After a 10th-place finish in Kuala Lumpur, and a 19th place in Hollywood, he made his first Pro Tour top eight at Pro Tour Berlin 2008. In the quarterfinals, Jůza was paired against one of his play test partners, former Rookie of the Year Sebastian Thaler, with Thaler winning the Elves mirror match by three games to two. Jůza rounded out the season with a 50th-place finish at the World Championship to earn level 7 standing in the Pro Players Club.

After his breakout season, Jůza very much adopted the Pro Tour lifestyle, playing fourteen of nineteen Grand Prix in 2009. He had a strong start to the season, earning 18 pro points by mid March. After a string of midfield finishes from March through July, Jůza made back to back Grand Prix finals, losing to Olivier Ruel in Brighton, and to Shingou Kurihara in Bangkok. At Pro Tour Austin, Jůza made his second Pro Tour top eight. Paired against Naoki Shimizu, he was once again defeated in the quarterfinal. To finish the season, Jůza made the top eight of Grand Prix Tampa Bay, and finished 41st at Worlds. With 64 pro points, Jůza finished third in the Player of the Year race and gained the highest Pro Players Club Level, 8.

The following season, Jůza did not do so well on the Pro Tour, his best finish being a 30th place at Pro Tour San Diego; and he earned only 17 pro points from his Pro Tour results. However, he made up for it on the Grand Prix circuit. Jůza played all but one of the Grand Prix, winning Grand Prix Portland and Bochum, and making the top eight of Grand Prix Nashville. Earning 37 points off tour, Jůza's 54 point total earned him fourth place in the Player of the Year race and level 8 in the Pro Players Club again.

In 2011, Jůza's Grand Prix dominance continued. Over the course of the year, he reached top eight of Grand Prix in Denver, Kobe, Santiago, and Hiroshima. His win in Hiroshima made Jůza the first European to win a Grand Prix in Japan, and he joined Raphaël Lévy, Shuhei Nakamura, and Alex Shvartsman as the fourth player to have won Grand Prix in Europe, North America, and Asia. On the Pro Tour, he had unremarkable results in Paris and Philadelphia, finishing below 100th place both times, but finished just one win short of making the top eight at Pro Tour Nagoya. For the third year in a row, Juza earned enough points to reach level 8 in the Pro Players Club, finishing fourth overall in the Player of the Year race.

Jůza made the top eight of one additional Grand Prix events in the 2012 season, in Madrid, and finished the season with enough points to achieve Platinum status in the new Pro Players Club system. In August, Jůza played in the inaugural Magic Players Championship (later renamed The World Championship), finishing 9th, as well as the World Magic Cup, where he was the captain of the Czech team. In the 2012–13 season, Jůza repeated his performance from the previous Grand Prix Bochum by winning the event again, and made the top eight of an additional three Grand Prix (in Manila, Philadelphia and Sydney). He once again attained Platinum status, and qualified for the World Championship for the second year in a row. This event did not go well for Jůza, however; he finished last. The 2013–14 season was a quiet one for Jůza. He made the top eight of three Grand Prix (Providence, Prague and Hong Kong), but needed to finish in the top 16 of the last Pro Tour of the year, Pro Tour Magic 2015 in order to reach Platinum status once again. He succeeded in doing so by finishing 11th, and reached the top level in the Pro Players Club for the sixth season in a row.

In the 2014–15 season, despite finishing in the top eight of four Grand Prix events (Strasbourg, Manila, Mexico City, Seville), Jůza failed to attain Platinum status. He ended the season on 42 points, enough for Gold, but four points shy of Platinum.

Achievements

References 

Living people
Czech Magic: The Gathering players
Sportspeople from Plzeň
1987 births